Roger Browne BD (circa 1541 - June 1601) was a Canon of Windsor from 1571 to 1601

Career

He was educated at Eton College and King's College, Cambridge where he graduated BA in 1561, MA in 1564, BD in 1576.

He was Vicar of South Weald, Essex (1567-1576), Rector of Duddinghurst (1567-1584), and Rector of Farnham Royal (1589-1601).

He was appointed to the seventh stall in St George's Chapel, Windsor Castle in 1571 and held the canonry until 1601.

Notes 

1601 deaths
Canons of Windsor
Alumni of King's College, Cambridge
People educated at Eton College
Year of birth unknown